The 32nd Cavalry Division was formed in 1938 in the Kiev Military District from the 1st Zaporozhe Cossack Cavalry Division.

Wartime Service

Invasion of Poland
The division participated in the Invasion of Poland.  It was assigned to the Ukrainian Front's Cavalry Group.

World War II
Assigned to the 9th Rifle Corps in the Crimea the division had been undergoing amphibious training before the war started.  On 10 July 1941 the division left for Gomel, leaving its assigned tank regiment behind, and was assigned to the 21st Army.  The division commander took command of the one of the first 'Cavalry Groups' of the war.  In July and August 1941 the group and the division raided into the rear areas and flanks of the German 2nd Army and 2nd Panzer Group south of Smolensk.  During this raid the division conducted a successful saber-swinging cavalry charge when they caught a German rear-echelon unit by surprise and overran it in a mounted attack.

In October–November 1941 the group and division operated along the flanks of the German attack towards Tula.  In December 1941 the division was assigned to the 5th Cavalry Corps in December 1941 before the Corps was redesignated as the 3rd Guards Cavalry Corps on 26 December 1941.

The division remained assigned to the 3rd Guards Cavalry Corps for the remainder of the war.  On 10 November 1942 the division absorbed the remnants of the 47th Cavalry Division as replacements.  In early 1943 the division was upgraded to the new cavalry standards.  The division received the 207th Tank Regiment in June 1943.

The division was disbanded in the summer of 1945.

Subordinate units

22 June 1941
65th Cavalry Regiment
86th Cavalry Regiment
121st Cavalry Regiment
197th Cavalry Regiment
5th Tank Regiment (T-38 and T-40 tanks)

June 1943
65th Cavalry Regiment
86th Cavalry Regiment
121st Cavalry Regiment
197th Cavalry Regiment
207th Tank Regiment

See also
 Cavalry Divisions of the Soviet Union 1917–1945

References

 

032
Military units and formations established in 1938
032
Military units and formations disestablished in 1945